Guna Lok Sabha constituency is one of the 29 Lok Sabha constituencies in the Indian state of Madhya Pradesh. This constituency covers the entire Ashok Nagar district and parts of Shivpuri and Guna districts.

Vidhan Sabha segments
Presently, Guna Lok Sabha constituency comprises the following eight Vidhan Sabha (Legislative Assembly) segments:

Members of Lok Sabha

^ by poll

Election Results

2019 Lok Sabha Election

2014 Lok Sabha Election

2004 Lok Sabha Election

1999 Lok Sabha Election
 Madhavrao Scindia (Congress) : 443,965 votes   
 Rao Deshraj Singh Yadav (BJP) : 229,537

2002 bye-poll

1998 Lok Sabha Election

1952 Lok Sabha Election
 V. G. Deshpande (Hindu Maha Sabha) :	56,518 votes   
 Gopi Krishna Vijayvargiya (INC) : 	53549

See also
 Guna district
 List of Constituencies of the Lok Sabha

References

Lok Sabha constituencies in Madhya Pradesh
Guna district
Ashoknagar district
Shivpuri district